Antonio León Amador, Spanish footballer
Antonio León Ortega, Spanish sculptor
Antonio León Zapata, Peruvian congressman
Antonio de León y Gama, Mexican astronomer, anthropologist and writer
Antonio Leon (swimmer), Paraguayan swimmer
Antonio León (soldier), active in the Battle of Molino del Rey